Smithies is a placename, the plural form of a Smithy industry, and also a relatively rare surname.

Places 
Smithies, South Yorkshire, an area of Barnsley, Yorkshire

People named Smithies 

Alex Smithies (born 1990), English football player
Bob Smithies (1934–2006), journalist and crossword compiler
Catherine Smithies (1785–1877), English philanthropist and campaigner
Frank Smithies (1912–2012), British mathematician
John Smithies (1802–1872), Wesleyan missionary
John J. Smithies (born 1954), founding director of the Australian Centre for the Moving Image
Karen Smithies (born 1969), English international cricketer
Oliver Smithies (1925–2017), British biologist
Thomas Bywater Smithies (1817–1883), English radical publisher and campaigner

See also 
 Smith (surname)
 Smithy (disambiguation)

English-language surnames